The first around the world sailing record for circumnavigation of the world was Juan Sebastián Elcano and the remaining members of Ferdinand Magellan's crew who completed their journey in 1522. The first solo record was set by Joshua Slocum in the Spray (1898).

The current record holders are IDEC 3, skippered by Francis Joyon in 40 days, 23 hours, 30 minutes and 30 seconds for a crewed journey, and François Gabart with Macif in 42 days, 16 hours, 40 minutes and 35 seconds for a solo journey.

Most races or solo attempts start from Europe. Due to the configuration of the continents, sailing around the world consists of sailing on the Southern Ocean around the Antarctica continent, passing south of Cape Horn, Cape of Good Hope and Cape Leeuwin. Since 1918 the Panama Canal is an option but the locks must be entered and exited using engine power. Large stretches of the canal can be crossed under sail power.

Sailing around the world can be done by two directions: eastward or westward. The dominant winds and currents (outside tropical areas) make the voyage eastwards on the Southern hemisphere faster, most skippers and yachts who race prefer this route. Today, the multihulls perform much better than monohulls and hold the best times. Leisure yacht skippers who prefer tropical seas more often go westward, using the trade winds (and the Panama canal). The Jules Verne Trophy is awarded to the skipper who breaks the previous Jules Verne record, starting from an imaginary line between the Créac'h lighthouse on Ushant island, France, and the Lizard Lighthouse, UK.

The records are homologated by the World Sailing Speed Record Council (WSSRC). WSSRC rules state that qualifying round-the-world voyages must be at least 21,600 nmi long, calculated along the shortest possible track from the starting port and back that does not cross land and does not go below 63°S. The great-circle distance formulas are to be used, assuming that the great circle length is 21,600 nmi. It is allowed to have one single waypoint to lengthen the calculated track. The equator must be crossed. In reality, this means that the boat should pass a waypoint at or not far from the antipode of the starting port of the journey (the exact position depends on how short the shortest possible track is). For example, the Vendée Globe starts at 46°N 2°W, has a waypoint at 57°S 180°E, and barely makes the distance requirement. The participants don't have to go to the antipode at 46°S 178°E since the rounding of Africa gives extra distance.

Notable races
The most famous races around the world are:
 The Vendée Globe , a non-stop solo race, currently run using the IMOCA 60 Class.
 The Ocean Race, a stopping fully crewed race, currently using the Volvo Ocean 65 and IMOCA 60 class. Previously known as the Whitbread Round The World Race and the Volvo Ocean Race.
 The Velux 5 Oceans Race , a stopping solo race, currently run using the IMOCA 60 Class previously known as the BOC Challenge, later as Around Alone.
 The Barcelona World Race , a non-stop two handed race, currently run using the IMOCA 60 Class.
 The Clipper Round the World Yacht Race , a stopping crewed race for amateur crews using the Clipper 70 Class.
 The Golden Globe Race has returned since 2018 as a retro sailing race without the use of modern technology for navigation.

Former races including:
 The Sunday Times Golden Globe Race, held in 1968-1969, the first round-the-world yacht race.
 The BT Global Challenge, was a race held every four years and followed the westward route.
 The Race, was a race held in 2000, involving multihulls.
 The Oryx Quest, held in 2005, starting from Qatar.

Notable solo achievements
From the first round-the-world yacht race (Sunday Times Golden Globe Race) in 1968, to November 2020, around 200 sailors tried their luck in a monohull and less than 100 managed to complete the course, mainly in the context of the Vendée Globe.

Only 6 sailors achieved the Westward route facing the dominant winds and currents.

Only 4 sailors managed to complete a round-the-world tour in a single-handed multihull without stopover and without assistance:
Francis Joyon (2004) 72 days, (2008) 57 days
Ellen MacArthur (2005) 71 days
Thomas Coville (2016) 49 days, (2011) 61 days, (2008) 59 days
Francois Gabart (2017) 42 days

Only 3 sailors have raced non-stop solo around the world in both directions. Mike Golding and Dee Caffari both set WSSRC Westbound world records using Global Challenge boats and also finishing the Eastbound Vendee Globe Race. In 2018 Jean-Luc Van Den Heede also managed this achievement.

Eastward route

Crewed

Single-handed

Multihulls

Monohulls

Non-stop Longest Distance Sailed
Recognised by the Guinness Book of Records

Singlehanded Female

The following voyages were pioneers and not officially recognized by the WSSRC.
 Ten women have completed the Vendee Globe two of these broke the outright record and more recently the establishment of a monohull record.
 In 1978  sailed solo round the world in 272d on Express Crusader (formerly Spirit of Cutty Sark) a 53 ft Monohull Van der Stadt design Gallant 53.
 In 1978  became the first women to sail around the world in 401-day voyage 1978

Singlehanded Female Monohull

Westward route
This route is the more demanding one, as it faces the dominant winds and currents. There are fewer attempts and records.

Outright Crewed
As of February 2010, no record has been homologated.

Outright Single-handed

Female Non-stop Single-handed

Passage records

Intermediate records
The rules for intermediate records are set by the WSSRC.
 Equator to Equator
 Indian Ocean
 Pacific Ocean
 South Atlantic Ocean

From Equator to Equator
From the Atlantic Ocean: Equator => Cape Agulhas (South Africa) => Around Antarctica => Cape Horn => Equator

Indian Ocean
from Cape Agulhas, South Africa (longitude 20°E) to Tasmania south point, (longitude : 146°49'E)

Pacific Ocean
Tasmania south point, (longitude : 146°49'E) to Cape Horn (longitude 67°16'W)

South Atlantic Ocean
From Cape Horn (longitude 67°16'W) to Cape Agulhas, South Africa (longitude 20°E)

From Jules Verne Trophy starting line (Ushant) to Equator (out of WSSRC rule)

From Equator to Cape of Good Hope (out of WSSRC rules)

From Cape Horn to Equator (out of WSSRC rules)
From the cape Horn, cutting the longitude 67°16'W, up to the Equator

From Equator to Jules Verne Trophy finishing line (Ushant) (out of WSSRC rules)

See also

 Circumnavigation
 List of circumnavigations
 List of youth solo sailing circumnavigations
Competitions and prizes
 Global Challenge
 Jules Verne Trophy
 The race
 Oryx Quest
 Vendée Globe
Other speed sailing records
 Speed sailing record
 World Sailing Speed Record Council
 Transatlantic sailing record

Notes and references

Sailing records